Kurt Trampedach (13 May 1943 – 12 November 2013) was a Danish painter and sculptor.

Biography
Trampedach was born at Hillerød. He studied at the Danish Academy of Fine Arts from 1963 to 1969. He had his artistic breakthrough by the end of the sixties. He has often made distorted self-portraits and portraits of his own wife. Portraits of horses, and of large- headed babies were other favorite motifs. His dark style was particularly inspired by Rembrandt van Rijn. Painting was a way for him to work with his own psyche, with frequent bouts of depression and mania. In 1983 Trampedach's studio in Copenhagen was set on fire destroying many paintings. In 1984 he received the Eckersberg Medal.

With his wife he moved to Sare in the French Pyrenees where he lived in a house built by himself, raising animals and painting.

In April 2002 his house and studio in France was burned down while he was in Denmark preparing an exhibition. And within a month his studio in Copenhagen was set on fire, destroying seven large paintings. Trampedach himself barely escaped the flames. Trampedach claimed that the fire in Copenhagen had been an attempt at his life by jealous colleagues. Some people claimed that he had started the fire himself, but in 2005 a French-Moroccan was sentenced for the crime in France, although the Copenhagen fires continue unresolved. After the fires he was struck by a severe depression and did not paint for the last years of his life.

Kurt Trampedach died at his home at Sare, Pyrénées-Atlantiques at the age of 70.

Museums

Trampedach's art is represented at the following Danish museums:

Statens Museum for Kunst
Vejle Kunstmuseum
Fyns Kunstmuseum
Nordjyllands Kunstmuseum
Kunstmuseet Trapholt, Kolding
Skive Kunstmuseum
Randers Kunstmuseum
ARoS Aarhus Kunstmuseum

References

External links
kurttrampedach.com

1943 births
2013 deaths
Contemporary painters
Danish sculptors
Danish male artists
Danish portrait painters
Recipients of the Eckersberg Medal
20th-century Danish people
20th-century Danish painters
20th-century sculptors
Male sculptors
20th-century Danish male artists